Don Franco e Don Ciccio nell'anno della contestazione (Don Franco and Don Ciccio in the year of protest) is a 1970 Italian comedy film written and directed by Marino Girolami starring the comic duo Franco and Ciccio.

Plot summary 
Don Franco and Don Ciccio are the respective pastors of the two principal parishes of a village in Sicily. The two have different ideals about society, and so they always fight by way: Don Franco is a priest more open to the social level, which supports the protests of the young communists, while Don Ciccio is a severe priest of the old school, who speaks in Latin and who hates communists protesters. One day the two bitterly quarrel over a disputed land of the city: Don Franco would create there a public park, with the support of the communists, while Don Ciccio would fain give it to the municipality for other interests. So the two fathers decide to settle the matter with a game of football.

Cast 
 Franco Franchi: Don Franco
 Ciccio Ingrassia: Don Ciccio  
 Edwige Fenech: Anna Bellinzoni
 Enio Girolami: Tenente dei Carabinieri
 Umberto D'Orsi: Orazio Caccamo
 Yvonne Sanson: Donna Camilla
 Lino Banfi: Cosimino
 Luca Sportelli: Maresciallo dei Carabinieri
 Enzo Andronico: Don Mimì Nicastro
 Renato Malavasi: Cavaliere Giacomo Bellinzoni
 Alfredo Rizzo: Veterinario 
 Giampiero Littera: Carabiniere Derlin

See also    
 List of Italian films of 1970

References

External links

1970 films
Italian buddy comedy films
1970s buddy comedy films
Films directed by Marino Girolami
Films scored by Piero Umiliani
1970s political comedy films
Films with screenplays by Marino Girolami
1970 comedy films
Italian political comedy films
1970s Italian-language films
1970s Italian films